Van Buren Boddie (January 20, 1869 - May 11, 1928) was a Democratic Mississippi state legislator in the early 20th century.

Biography 
Van Buren Boddie was born on January 20, 1869, in Memphis, Tennessee. He was the son of Van Buren Boddie and Anna (Jewell) Boddie. He did not go to college, but he studied law at a law firm. He was admitted to the bar in 1892. He was first appointed to the Mississippi House of Representatives, as a Democrat, in 1902, to fill in for the unfinished term of F. E. Larkin. In 1906, he was appointed to fill in for the term of Percy Bell. He was first elected to the House in 1907, and served from 1908 to 1912. All three stints were for representing Washington County. In 1911, he was elected to the Mississippi State Senate to represent the state's 29th district. He was re-elected in 1915. After this, he was partners in a law firm with fellow state senator Hazlewood Power Farish. He was elected to serve in the Senate from 1928 to 1932, but resigned in the 1928 session because of illness. He died on May 11, 1928, in his home in Greenville, Mississippi.

References 

1869 births
1928 deaths
Politicians from Greenville, Mississippi
Politicians from Memphis, Tennessee
Democratic Party members of the Mississippi House of Representatives
Democratic Party Mississippi state senators
Mississippi lawyers